Ole Byriel (born 3 January 1958) is a Danish former cyclist. He competed in the individual road race event at the 1984 Summer Olympics.

References

External links
 

1958 births
Living people
Danish male cyclists
Olympic cyclists of Denmark
Cyclists at the 1984 Summer Olympics
Sportspeople from Aarhus